The IMOCA 60 Class yacht Corum L'Epargne, FRA 9 was designed by Juan Kouyoumdjian and launched on 5 May 2020 after being built CDK Technologies based in Lorient, France.

Racing Results

References 

Individual sailing yachts
2020s sailing yachts
Sailboat type designs by Juan Kouyoumdjian
CDK Technologies
Vendée Globe boats
IMOCA 60